The men's 1500 metres T46 event at the 2020 Summer Paralympics in Tokyo took place on 28 August 2021.

Records
Prior to the competition, the existing records were as follows:

Results

Final
The final took place on 28 August 2021, at 10:28:

References

Men's 1500 metres T46
2021 in men's athletics